Car Toys, Inc. is a medium-sized chain of stores, founded and headquartered in Seattle. There are currently 50 stores, distributed throughout Washington, Oregon, Colorado, and Texas. Car Toys currently has over 1,000 employees, some of whom work in both the corporate headquarters and a distribution center. The retailer specializes in all assortment of mobile electronics products, but primarily sells automobile audio equipment and wireless phone devices.

History
Car Toys was founded in 1987 by Dan Brettler, who continues as the President and CEO of Car Toys. The company has a Board of Directors though shares are not publicly traded. In 2004, Twice Magazine ranked Car Toys as the 5th largest national mobile electronic retailer.

Awards and recognition
Recognized as a "Retailer of the Year" numerous times by Mobile Electronics Magazine, Mobile Electronics Certification Program and CES Daily, Car Toys has been included in Audio/Video International Magazine's "Top Ten 12-Volt Retailers" for 12 years running and is the only 12-volt retailer currently listed in Twice's "Top 100" list of top consumer electronic retailers.

External links
CarToys website

1987 establishments in Washington (state)
Auto parts suppliers of the United States
Companies based in Seattle
Retail companies established in 1987
American companies established in 1987